The  2012 Iowa Corn Indy 250 was the sixth running of the Iowa Corn Indy 250 and the ninth round of the 2012 IndyCar Series season.

It took place on Saturday, June 23, 2012. The race was contested for 250 laps at  Iowa Speedway in Newton, Iowa, and was televised by NBC Sports in the United States. 

Pole sitter Dario Franchitti of Chip Ganassi Racing fell out of the race before the green flag due to engine failure. Ryan Hunter-Reay of Andretti Autosport won the race, his second consecutive win of the season.

References

 
Iowa Corn Indy 250
Iowa Corn Indy 250
Iowa Corn Indy 250